These are the official results of the men's 4 × 400 metres relay event at the 1992 Summer Olympics in Barcelona, Spain. There were a total number of 24 nations competing, with three qualifying heats.

Medalists

* Athletes who participated in the heats only and received medals.

Records
These were the standing world and Olympic records (in minutes) prior to the 1992 Summer Olympics.

(*) Altitude over 1000 metres

The following Olympic records were set during this competition. The United States set a new world record with 2:55.74 in the final.

Summary
Coming out of the start in the final, Lázaro Martínez for Cuba began to pull away from Samson Kitur for Kenya to the inside.  Similarly American Andrew Valmon gained on Udeme Ekpeyong for Nigeria to his outside.  Coming off the turn, Valmon had the lead and further separated from a slowing Martínez.  Kitur and GBR's Roger Black closed to tighten the battle for second.  Kenya passed second as Abednego Matilu led the group through the turn.  But American Gold medalist Quincy Watts was long gone with a 10-metre lead by the break.  Down the backstretch, GBR's David Grindley was able to pass Matilu on the inside followed by Cuba's Héctor Herrera on the outside.  At the 200 metre start line, halfway through the lap, Matilu just stopped like he had finished a 200-metre interval, taking Kenya out of the race.  Watts padded another 5 metres to the American lead, passing to future world record holder Michael Johnson.  Watts' 43.1 split was at the time the fastest relay split in history, and today still ranks tied for #4.  Grindley held a metre lead into the handoff to Kriss Akabusi.  Johnson had suffered from food poisoning in Barcelona, which took him out of the 200 metres competition just a few days earlier.  Here Johnson appeared healthy, extending the American lead to over 20 metres.  Behind him, Cuban Norberto Téllez moved onto Akabusi's shoulder, ready to pounce coming off the final turn, but Akabusi held him off.  Johnson passed off to 1988 gold medalist, world junior record holder Steve Lewis two and a half seconds before Akabusi passed to John Regis and Téllez to Roberto Hernández.  The more experienced Hernández pounced on 200 metre runner Regis through the first turn.  USA had a half a straightaway lead to take the gold unchallenged.  Their new world record time flashed on the scoreboard around the stadium for almost 4 seconds before Hernández and Regis arrived.

Final
Held on August 8, 1992

Heats

See also
 1988 Men's Olympic 4 × 400 m Relay (Seoul)
 1990 Men's European Championships 4 × 400 m Relay (Split)
 1991 Men's World Championships 4 × 400 m Relay (Tokyo)
 1993 Men's World Championships 4 × 400 m Relay (Stuttgart)
 1994 Men's European Championships 4 × 400 m Relay (Helsinki)
 1995 Men's World Championships 4 × 400 m Relay (Gothenburg)

References

External links
 Official Report
 Results

R
Relay foot races at the Olympics
Men's events at the 1992 Summer Olympics